Ola Olsen (25 October 1891 – 13 April 1973) was a Norwegian politician for the Christian Democratic Party.

He was born in Finnås.

He was elected to the Norwegian Parliament from Hordaland in 1954, and was re-elected once. He had previously served in the position of deputy representative during the term 1945–1949.

Olsen was a member of Bremnes municipality council from 1928 to 1931.

References

1891 births
1973 deaths
Christian Democratic Party (Norway) politicians
Members of the Storting
20th-century Norwegian politicians